The Judge Henry F. Gregory House is a historic home in Vero Beach, Florida, United States. It is located at 2179 10th Avenue. On June 3, 1994, it was added to the U.S. National Register of Historic Places. Bruce Kitchell was the architect and the home was built in the Monterey Colonial style.

References

Houses on the National Register of Historic Places in Florida
National Register of Historic Places in Indian River County, Florida
Buildings and structures in Vero Beach, Florida
Houses in Indian River County, Florida
1937 establishments in Florida
Houses completed in 1937